Brett Thompson (born August 17, 1990) is an American former rugby union player. He was named in United States' squad for the 2015 Rugby World Cup. He plays as a wing or fullback in fifteens, and as a forward in sevens. He retired from professional rugby in December 2021.

References

External links 
 

1990 births
Living people
American rugby union players
United States international rugby union players
Edinburgh Rugby players
Rugby union wings
Rugby union fullbacks
Pan American Games medalists in rugby sevens
Pan American Games bronze medalists for the United States
Rugby sevens players at the 2015 Pan American Games
Medalists at the 2015 Pan American Games
Rugby sevens players at the 2020 Summer Olympics
Olympic rugby sevens players of the United States